The Tainai Deers is an American football team located in Chofu, Tokyo, Japan.  They are a member of the X-League.

Team history
1989 Team founded by the Kajima Business group. Team known as the Kajima Deers
1992 Promoted from X2 to X1.
1997 Won first Tokyo Super Bowl title.
2009 Won 2nd Japan X Bowl title and 1st Rice Bowl National Championship

 2014 Kajima Group ends team sponsorship. Lixil Group offers new sponsorship. Team renamed the LIXIL Deers.

 2021 Lixil Group end sponsorship. Team renamed Deers Football Club.

 2022 Team renamed Tainai Deers.

Seasons
{| class="wikitable"
|bgcolor="#FFCCCC"|X-League Champions (1987–present)
|bgcolor="#DDFFDD"|<small>Division Champions</small>
|bgcolor="#D0E7FF"|Final Stage/Semifinals Berth
|bgcolor="#96CDCD"|Wild Card /2nd Stage Berth
|}

Head coaches

Current Import PlayersFormer Import players'''

References

External links
  (Japanese)

American football in Japan
Lixil Group
1989 establishments in Japan
American football teams established in 1989
X-League teams